Greece hosted the 1982 European Athletics Championships in the Olympic Stadium of Athens, participating with a team of 29 athletes.

Medals

References

http://www.sansimera.gr/articles/804

1982
1982 in Greek sport